Thomas Locker (June 26, 1937 — March 9, 2012) was an American landscape painter and award winning illustrator, and author of Children's literature  His oil paintings follow in the tradition of the 19th-century Hudson River School of painting.

Born in New York City, Thomas Locker was raised in Washington D.C. where his father worked as a lobbyist. At age six he started training in traditional old-world techniques with painter Umberto Roberto Romano .  At age seven, Locker won first prize in the children's division of the Washington Times-Herald annual art fair. Locker earned an A.B. in Art History at the University of Chicago and an M.A. from the American University, Washington DC. While at the University of Chicago he studied under professor Joshua C. Taylor , future director of the Smithsonian American Art Museum.  After graduating, he studied art while travelling in Europe.

In 1964 Locker began his more than 75 solo exhibitions career, starting with the Banter Gallery, New York City. He painted 17th century Dutch-inspired oil landscapes, selling through Sears' The Vincent Price Collection, Chicago. During these years he also taught at Franklin College and Shimer College, while he and his wife raised their five children.

In 1982, Locker began bringing the world of fine painting to children and young adults, producing thirty-six popular illustrated books. He authored most of these books and illustrated with his Hudson River School style oil paintings. Several books were collaborative works with his second wife, chemistry teacher and weaving expert Candace Christiansen. Locker also illustrated books for other popular writers such as Jean Craighead George. Many of these books became staples of school libraries. Locker's works received numerous awards including the 1989 Christopher Award, the John Burroughs Medal, the 1984  New York Times Book Review Best Illustrated Children's Book and the ALA Notable Books for Children list.

Locker experienced a near-death aneurysm in 2002. After this he moved from the Hudson River Valley to the less populated Catskills and returned to full-time oil painting of the American landscape. He remained in Albany, N.Y. until his death at age 74.

Books 

Where the River Begins (1984)
The Mare on the Hill (1985)
Sailing with the Wind (1986)
To Climb a Waterfall (1995)
Sky Tree: Seeing Science Through Art (1995)
Water Dance (1997)
Cloud Dance (2000)Mountain Dance (2001)The Boy Who Held Back the Sea. A retelling of the traditional Dutch folktale. Washington Irving's Rip Van WinkleThe Ugly Duckling as told by Marianne MayerCatskill Eagle by Herman MelvilleAnna and the BagpiperFamily Farm The Ice HorseGrandfather's Christmas TreeThe First ThanksgivingCalico and Tin HornsMiranda's SmileThe Young Artist Rembrandt and Titus: Artist and Son; by Madeleine ComoraRembrandt and Titus Classroom PostersHome: A Journey through AmericaHudson: The Story of a RiverSnow Toward Evening: A Year in a River Valley / Nature Poems selected by Josette Frank In Blue Mountains: An Artist's Return to America's First Wilderness (2000)Images of Conservationists (Series): Walking With Henry: Based on the Life and Works of Henry David Thoreau (2002)
Images of Conservationists (Series): Rachel Carson: Preserving a Sense of Wonder
Images of Conservationists (Series): John Muir: America's Naturalist
Teacher's Guide to John Muir (Images of Conservationists series)
Journey to the Mountaintop: On Living and Meaning
The Land of Gray Wolf 
The Earth Under Sky Bear's Feet
Thirteen Moons on Turtle's Back: A Native American Year of Moons
Between Earth & Sky: Legends of Native American Sacred Places
The Man Who Paints Nature by Thomas Locker (Meet the Author series; Richard C. Owen Publishers)

Exhibition catalogs
Exhibition catalog: "Thomas Locker: The New American Realism" (R.S. Johnson-International Gallery, Spring, 1972)
Exhibition catalog: "Thomas Locker: American landscapes: [exhibition] September 16-October 4, 1980, Hammer Galleries, New York"

Notes 

American male writers
20th-century American painters
American male painters
21st-century American painters
1937 births
2012 deaths
Shimer College faculty
Franklin College (Indiana) faculty
20th-century American male artists